Sharmila Devar is an American actress. She is best known for her roles Lata in the NBC comedy series, Outsourced, and as Lauren Wellman, one of President's assistants, in the ABC political drama, Scandal.

Career

Devar graduated from the University of Chicago with her Bachelor's degree in economics. She also guest starred on Gilmore Girls, Grey's Anatomy, and Private Practice.

Filmography

Film

Television

Video Games

References

External links
 

Living people
American film actresses
American television actresses
20th-century American actresses
21st-century American actresses
American stage actresses
University of Chicago alumni
Year of birth missing (living people)